The 2014 Maine gubernatorial election took place on November 4, 2014, to elect the governor of Maine. Incumbent Republican governor Paul LePage ran for re-election to a second term in office, against Democrat Mike Michaud, the U.S. representative from the second district, and independent Eliot Cutler, an attorney and second-place finisher from the 2010 gubernatorial election. The primary elections were held on June 10, 2014.

LePage was initially considered vulnerable in this race, due to persistent approval ratings below 50%. The consensus among The Cook Political Report, Governing and The Rothenberg Political Report was that the race was a "tossup" and Daily Kos Elections and Sabato's Crystal Ball rated the race as "lean Democratic".

LePage won re-election to a second term with 48.2% of the popular vote.

Background
After a close three-way election in 2010, Republican Paul LePage, the mayor of Waterville, was elected governor with 38% of the vote. He beat independent candidate Eliot Cutler, who won 36%, and Democrat Libby Mitchell, the president of the Maine Senate, who won 19%. Republican gubernatorial nominees in Maine have failed to win a majority of the vote in 12 consecutive cycles over the last 50+ years – the longest such GOP streak in the nation. No governor has been popularly elected with less than 40 percent of the vote in two consecutive cycles in U.S. history.

Republican primary

Candidates

Declared
 Paul LePage, incumbent governor

Polling

Who should challenge LePage in a primary?

Results

Democratic primary

Candidates

Declared
 Mike Michaud, U.S. Representative

Withdrew
 David Slagger, former Maliseet representative to the Maine House of Representatives (switched parties to the Maine Green Independent Party, then unenrolled)
 Steve Woods, businessman, chairman of the Yarmouth Town Council and independent candidate for the U.S. Senate in 2012 (endorsed Michaud)

Declined
 Justin Alfond, President of the Maine Senate
 John Baldacci, former governor
 Emily Cain, state senator (running for ME-02)
 Matthew Dunlap, Secretary of State of Maine
 Mark Eves, Speaker of the Maine House of Representatives
 Jeremy Fischer, former state representative
 Janet T. Mills, Maine Attorney General
 Karen Mills, Administrator of the Small Business Administration
 Chellie Pingree, U.S. Representative
 Hannah Pingree, former Speaker of the Maine House of Representatives

Polling

Results

Green Independent primary

Candidates

Withdrew
 David Slagger, former Maliseet representative to the Maine House of Representatives (originally declared as a Democrat, switched parties, then unenrolled)

Independents

Candidates

Declared
 Eliot Cutler, attorney, board member of Americans Elect and candidate for governor in 2010

Withdrew
 Adam Eldridge
 Lee Schultheis, co-founder of Hatteras Alternative Mutual Funds
 David Slagger, former Maliseet representative to the Maine House of Representatives (originally declared as a Democrat, switched parties, then unenrolled)

Declined
 Shawn Moody, businessman and candidate for governor in 2010

General election

Candidates
 Paul LePage (Republican), incumbent governor
 Mike Michaud (Democratic), U.S. Representative
 Eliot Cutler (Independent), attorney, board member of Americans Elect and candidate for governor in 2010

Campaign
On January 17, 2014, Eliot Cutler announced that he had challenged LePage and Michaud to a series of policy debates, with at least one to be held in each of Maine's 16 counties, over the course of the campaign. Cutler noted that neither man had a primary challenger and as such the field is largely set, with plenty of time to debate. Both LePage and Michaud's campaigns criticized Cutler as issuing such a challenge only to jump-start his campaign and generate attention.

Lee Schultheis said that his campaign was not about winning the election, but about encouraging honest conversation on the issues and working towards compromise, while criticizing the win-at-any-cost mentality in politics. He summarized his campaign as "I'm running for Governor, but not really". He had qualified for the ballot and as such had been invited to at least one debate. However, citing the fact that two of three debates he had been invited to had been cancelled, as well as the difficulty of an independent working in the two-party system, he withdrew from the race on September 5, 2014.

Cutler posted a video to his Facebook and Twitter accounts on May 5, 2014, where he responded to a voter's question about his candidacy potentially splitting the vote again. He stated that his supporters, if they felt on the night before the election that he could not win, should vote for someone else.

In July 2014, Cutler claimed that in May 2011 he had been approached by Maine Democratic Party Chairman Ben Grant to run as a Democrat in 2014, with assurances that the Party would "clear the field" in such a circumstance. Grant denied Cutler's claim, calling it "100 percent false", stating that while he had met with Cutler, that subject was not discussed. He added that the party had been focused solely on getting Mike Michaud or Chellie Pingree to run for governor. Cutler stated that he would be willing to sign an affidavit on the matter, as he remembered the conversation "very clearly". Attorney and Democratic activist Severin Beliveau disputed Cutler's claim that he had been offered a "cleared field", saying: "That's [Cutler's] ego. We all have egos, but his is in another world, in the ether somewhere." Cutler further claimed that in the spring of 2011 he was asked by then-Maine Republican Party Chairman Charlie Webster to join the Republican Party. Webster also repudiated Cutler's claim, saying that he only met Cutler as a courtesy, asking "why would Republicans want a candidate who doesn't share our views? That doesn't make sense."

LePage stated on a WVOM-FM radio show on August 7 that he believes he will either win by a landslide or lose by a landslide, stating that his views are too different from his opponents' to result in a close race.

On September 18, LePage told the editorial board of The Portsmouth Herald that he did not want their endorsement, saying his interest in it was "none, zero". He further stated "I'm not about politics. I'm about issues. I do not want be endorsed. I don't want to be mentioned in the same vein as Mike Michaud."

In mid-October, it was reported that the Maine Republican Party had begun spending money to target Democratic voters with negative attacks against Michaud that also praised Cutler, in believing Cutler would play a spoiler role. LePage had previously said in June that Cutler's candidacy was good for his re-election campaign. Meanwhile, Cutler himself has appeared to be winding down his campaign, decreasing his spending on television advertisements, leading to speculation that he was essentially conceding the race. By the end of October, this seemed to be confirmed, as columnist Ethan Strimling noted that Cutler's weekly TV spending had decreased across October from $55,000 to $50,000, then $29,000, down to $4,000. By contrast, campaign committees and outside groups supporting LePage and Michaud were outspending him 100-to-1 each.

In late October, the Republican Governors Association began airing a television advertisement that attacked Michaud before pivoting to praise Cutler, noting that he had been endorsed by Independent U.S. Senator and former Independent Governor Angus King. The spot did not mention LePage, hoping instead to persuade Michaud supporters to vote for Cutler. Michaud campaign manager Matt McTighe called it "a desperate attempt to split the vote that is uniting to defeat Gov. LePage" and King, despite having endorsed Cutler, accused the RGA of "trying to trick people" and called their tactics "[dis]honest... they're trying to promote one candidate when they're really trying to promote someone else."

After Cutler announced that he would hold a press conference on October 29, it was speculated that he was doing so to withdraw from the race. Cutler did not announce his withdrawal but did say that he was a "realist" and acknowledged that any victory by him would be a "long shot". He said that his supporters should "vote their consciences", whether that be for LePage or Michaud. Cutler went on to say that he would not withdraw to "kowtow to party politics and allow a bunch of political polls to drown out the voices of thousands of Mainers who believe that standing for principles, ideals and ideas makes you an American, not a spoiler." However, his announcement was seen by many as "an acknowledgement that [his] campaign is over." Cutler also encouraged Maine voters to support a proposed citizen initiative to implement ranked choice voting.

Immediately after his press conference, a group of former Cutler supporters reiterated their backing of Michaud, saying that "the right thing now is to unite behind Mike Michaud." Shortly after, Angus King announced that he was switching his endorsement from Cutler to Michaud, explaining: "it is clear that the voters of Maine are not prepared to elect Eliot... The good news is that we still have a chance to elect a governor who will represent the majority of Maine people: my friend and colleague, Mike Michaud." Cutler stated that he was "obviously disappointed" by King's change.

Debates
The Michaud campaign stated on July 30 that Michaud would only participate in debates where LePage is present and not attend ones where Cutler is the only other participant, because: "we are running against Paul LePage, he's who we are looking to unseat". The LePage campaign has said they will schedule debates around the Governor's work schedule and priorities and declined to participate in a debate in the Lewiston/Auburn area in September. Cutler criticized both men as "cowards" and said that they wanted voters to make their decision "on the basis of a cascade of negative television ads bought by outside special interests". Michaud's campaign responded that at least four debates have been scheduled so far.

Despite Michaud's position on debates, he did appear at a forum on September 12 to discuss energy policy topics with only Cutler, after LePage abruptly withdrew from participating, citing what he called a change in the format of the event. The LePage campaign stated that they had thought each candidate would appear on stage separately, but learned the day of the event that the candidates would share a stage. LePage said: "If you set up a format, you've got to stick to that format" and his campaign said event organizers "attempted to arrange a setting to put politics ahead of public policy". They denied the withdrawal was politically motivated to force Michaud to debate Cutler. Both the Michaud and Cutler campaigns stated they were aware of the format. Cutler offered to leave the stage while LePage spoke, but that did not change LePage's mind. Event organizers stated "there was no intent to place politics before policy" and that the issue distracted from their efforts to discuss energy policy.

LePage told WMTW Channel 8 on September 22 that he was considering not participating in any debates with Michaud, though he was still willing to debate Cutler alone. He said he did not want to share a stage with Michaud due to his not having criticized a TV advertisement by a liberal PAC publicizing a press release where LePage called Social Security "welfare, pure and simple", which LePage later stated was not what he meant. LePage said that he used to respect Michaud but called the lack of criticism "sad". Michaud responded by issuing a statement saying that LePage was looking for an excuse to avoid debates and that he should instead use them "to set the record straight and explain why he said in a press release that Social Security is 'welfare' and why Maine's economy hasn't recovered as quickly as the rest of the country." Michaud went on to state that "It's not a gubernatorial debate without the Governor." Cutler issued a statement that both the other men should "stop playing games". Michaud stated the following day at a press conference that he would attend the six debates that his campaign agreed to, regardless of what LePage does. He stated that he expected LePage would attend once his "temper tantrum" was over.

LePage announced on September 28 that he would participate in five debates, saying "This decision has come after much reflection over the past week on the value in debating Congressman Michael Michaud, who has continually been dishonest with the Maine people about Governor LePage's stance on Social Security", and saying he wanted to set the record straight.

Endorsements

Predictions

Polling

Two-way races

Three-way races

Results

See also
 2014 United States gubernatorial elections
 2014 United States Senate election in Maine

References

External links
 Maine gubernatorial election, 2014 at Ballotpedia
 Campaign contributions at FollowTheMoney.org

Official campaign websites (Archived)
 Eliot Cutler for Governor
 Paul LePage for Governor
 Mike Michaud for Governor
 GBNR2014- Lee Schultheis campaign for Governor
 David Slagger for Governor

Gubernatorial
2014
2014 United States gubernatorial elections